Khasareh (also Romanized as Khasāreh; also known as Ḩasāreh and Khasrakh) is a village in Darram Rural District, in the Central District of Tarom County, Zanjan Province, Iran. At the 2006 census, its population was 78, in 23 families.

References 

Populated places in Tarom County